Eleven Arts is a film production and distribution company based in Los Angeles, California. The company has Japanese executives and has "a largely Japanese lineup". It specializes in importing anime from Japan to the United States.

Company history
Eleven Arts was founded by Ko Mori in 1997.

In 2008, Eleven Arts partnered with Funimation to distribute Love and Honor (2006) in the United States. It also sold Man, Woman and the Wall to TLA Releasing for distribution in the US and the UK. In 2009, Eleven Arts acquired distribution rights to Vampire Girl vs. Frankenstein Girl. In 2012, the company partnered with Edlead to produce and distribute several films a year for international audiences.

The company releases Japanese anime films on home video in the United States market, though it has struggled with sales due to the prevalence of illegal downloads. It also filed in 2013 a lawsuit against a DVD distributor for distributing inferior copies of anime films based on poor sales numbers. And in response to piracy, Eleven Arts sought to release anime films in the United States before it is released on home video in Japan. For instance, Eleven Arts released Sword Art Online The Movie: Ordinal Scale in the United States three weeks after it was released in Japan.

On August 11, 2018, it was announced at Otakon 2018 that Eleven Arts had partnered with Right Stuf Inc. to become the exclusive distributor for select Eleven Arts titles on home video. On October 3, 2018, it was announced Eleven Arts and Shout! Factory had signed a distribution deal, whereby Shout! Factory would distribute Eleven Arts' titles for home video. Eleven Arts also clarified that this deal would not affect their partnership with Right Stuf.

Filmography

References

External links
 
  

1997 establishments in California
American companies established in 1997
Anime companies
Companies based in Los Angeles
Film distributors of the United States
Film production companies of the United States